Schindleria is a genus of marine fish. It was the only genus of family Schindleriidae, among the Gobioidei of order Perciformes but is now classified under the Gobiidae in the Gobiiformes. The type species is S. praematura, Schindler's fish. The Schindleria species are known generically as Schindler's fishes after German zoologist Otto Schindler (1906–1959), or infantfishes. They are native to the southern Pacific Ocean, from the South China Sea to the Great Barrier Reef off eastern Australia.

Description 
The infant fishes are so called because they retain many of their larval characteristics (an example of neoteny). Their elongated bodies are transparent, and many of the bones never develop. All of the Schindleria species are reef fishes. They may be among the most common fish of the reefs, based on the results of plankton tows, but because of their transparency and small size, they are infrequently seen in life.

A recently described species, the stout infantfish, S. brevipinguis, was briefly the world's smallest known vertebrate at 8 mm (about one-third inch), smaller even than the dwarf gobies, until the new record was set by the 7.9-mm Paedocypris progenetica in early 2006 and supplanted by the 7.7-mm frog Paedophryne amauensis in 2012.

Apparently several (at least eight) further Schindleria species, native to the Ryukyu Islands, are yet to be described formally.

Species 
 Schindleria brevipinguis Watson & Walker, 2004 (Stout infantfish) 
 Schindleria elongata R. Fricke & Abu El-Regal, 2017 (Elongate paedomorphic goby) 
 Schindleria macrodentata Ahnelt & Sauberer, 2018
 Schindleria nigropunctata Fricke & Abu El-Regal, 2017
 Schindleria parva Abu El-Regal, El-Sherbiny, Gabr & Fricke, 2021
 Schindleria pietschmanni (Schindler, 1931)
 Schindleria praematura (Schindler's fish) (Schindler, 1930)

See also 
 "The Fish (Schindleria Praematurus)" for the song by progressive rock band Yes

References

Sources 
 
 
 

Schindleriidae
Gobiidae
Fish of Hawaii